The Yukon deermouse or Yukon deer mouse (Peromyscus arcticus) is a species of rodent in the family Cricetidae. It is endemic to Yukon Territory in Canada.

Taxonomy 
The species was first identified as Peromyscus arcticus in 1845 by Johann Andreas Wagner. In 1998, following extensive sampling of deermouse specimens throughout northern British Columbia, central Yukon, and northern southeast Alaska, Melanie Wike identified a unique lineage that did not associate with the western deer mouse (P. sonoriensis) (then thought to be North American deermouse, or P. maniculatus) or northwestern deermouse (P. keeni), both of which also reach the northern limits of their range in the Yukon, and identified it with the previously-described P. arcticus. Genetic studies in 2007 and 2019 further affirmed P. arcticus as a distinct species, and was later classified as such by the American Society of Mammalogists.

Distribution 
The species ranges within Yukon from Sulphur Lake southeast to Kluane National Park and Reserve and Annie Lake.

References 

Peromyscus
Rodents of North America
Mammals of Canada
Endemic fauna of Yukon
Mammals described in 1845
Taxa named by Johann Andreas Wagner